Acqua & Sapone was a professional continental cycling team based in Italy and participated in UCI Europe Tour and when selected as a wildcard to UCI ProTour events. They were managed by Palmiro Masciarelli, assisted by directeur sportifs Lorenzo Di Lorenzo, Bruno Cenghialta and Franco Gini. The team won team championship (or team points ranking) on the 2005–06 UCI Europe Tour.

The team folded at the end of the 2012 season, after losing their main backing.

2012 roster

Major wins

2004
Stage 3 Settimana Internazionale di Coppi e Bartali, Crescenzo D'Amore
Stage 5 Settimana Internazionale di Coppi e Bartali, Ruggero Marzoli
Stage 2 Giro d'Abruzzo, Ruggero Marzoli
Stage 2 & 6 Circuit des Mines, Denis Bertolini
Stage 2 Course de la Paix, Denis Bertolini
Stage 9 Giro d'Italia, Fred Rodriguez
Wachovia Classic, Fred Rodriguez
 Road Race Championship, Ondřej Sosenka
Overall Tour de Pologne, Ondřej Sosenka
Stage 5, Rinaldo Nocentini
Stage 8, Ondřej Sosenka

2005
Prologue UNIQA Classic, Ondřej Sosenka
Stage 3b Tour of Belgium, Ondřej Sosenka
Stage 1 Tour of Slovenia, Ruggero Marzoli
Subida al Naranco, Rinaldo Nocentini
 Time Trial Championship, Ondřej Sosenka
Trofeo Matteotti, Ruggero Marzoli
Chrono des Herbiers, Ondřej Sosenka

2006
Stage 2 Settimana Lombarda, Gabriele Balducci
Giro dell'Appennino, Rinaldo Nocentini
Stage 5 Course de la Paix, Kanstantsin Sivtsov
Overall Circuit de Lorraine, Juan Mauricio Soler
Stage 2, Juan Mauricio Soler
Stage 2 Euskal Bizikleta, Andrea Tonti
 Road Race Championship, Kanstantsin Sivtsov
 Time Trial Championship, Ondřej Sosenka
GP Fred Mengoni, Andrea Tonti
Giro del Veneto, Rinaldo Nocentini
Coppa Placci, Rinaldo Nocentini

2007
Stage 5 Tour Méditerranéen, Gabriele Balducci
Stage 2 Tirreno–Adriatico, Alexandr Arekeev
Overall Settimana Internazionale di Coppi e Bartali, Michele Scarponi
Stage 2, Michele Scarponi
Stage 3 Giro del Trentino, Stefano Garzelli
Overall Tour of Japan, Francesco Masciarelli
Stage 3 & 5, Francesco Masciarelli
Stage 14 & 16 Giro d'Italia, Stefano Garzelli
Stage 2 Tour of Slovenia, Stefano Garzelli
 Road Race Championship, Branislau Samoilau
 Time Trial Championship, Andrei Kunitski
Stage 3 Tour de Wallonie, Giuseppe Palumbo
Stage 3 Vuelta a Burgos, Aurélien Passeron
Gran Premio Industria e Commercio Artigianato Carnaghese, Aurélien Passeron

2008
Stage 1 Giro della Provincia di Reggio Calabria, Gabriele Balducci
Trofeo Laigueglia, Luca Paolini
Stage 3 Settimana Lombarda, Gabriele Balducci
Stage 5 Settimana Lombarda, Branislau Samoilau
Stage 6 Settimana Lombarda, Francesco Failli
Stage 2 & 4 Giro del Trentino, Stefano Garzelli
Stage 2 Vuelta a La Rioja, Diego Milán
Stage 2a & 3 Vuelta a Asturias, Stefano Garzelli
Stage 2 GP Paredes Rota dos Moveis, Diego Milán
 Time Trial Championship, Andrei Kunitski
Stage 1 Vuelta a Burgos, Andrei Kunitski
Coppa Placci, Luca Paolini
Grand Prix de Wallonie, Stefano Garzelli
Giro del Lazio, Francesco Masciarelli

2009
Stage 6 Settimana Lombarda, Luca Paolini
Stages 4 & 17 Giro d'Italia, Stefano Garzelli
 Mountain classification Giro d'Italia, Stefano Garzelli
Coppa Bernocchi, Luca Paolini

2010
Stage 5 Tour Méditerranéen, Francesco Masciarelli
Overall Tirreno–Adriatico, Stefano Garzelli
Stage 16 Giro d'Italia, Stefano Garzelli
 Road Race Championships, Rafaâ Chtioui

2011
Stage 2 Settimana Internazionale di Coppi e Bartali, Claudio Corioni
 Mountain classification Giro d'Italia, Stefano Garzelli
Gran Premio Città di Camaiore, Fabio Taborre
Memorial Marco Pantani, Fabio Taborre
Giro dell'Emilia, Carlos Betancur

2012
 Road Race Championships, Vladimir Miholjević
 Time Trial Championships, Vladimir Miholjević
Stage 4 Circuit de Lorraine, Danilo Napolitano
Stage 5 Tour of Belgium, Carlos Betancur
Trofeo Melinda, Carlos Betancur
Stage 2 Tour of Austria, Danilo Di Luca
Stage 5 Tour of Austria, Fabio Taborre
Gran Premio Nobili Rubinetterie, Danilo Di Luca
Stages 2, 4 & 5 Tour de Wallonie, Danilo Napolitano
Stage 5 Giro di Padania, Carlos Betancur

National champions

2004
 Road Race Championship, Ondřej Sosenka
2005
 Time Trial Championship, Ondřej Sosenka
2006
 Belarus Road Race Championship, Kanstantsin Sivtsov
 Time Trial Championship, Ondřej Sosenka
2007
 Belarus Road Race Championship, Branislau Samoilau
 Belarus Time Trial Championship, Andrei Kunitski
2008
 Belarus Time Trial Championship, Andrei Kunitski
2010
 Tunisia Road Race Championships, Rafaâ Chtioui
2012
  Croatia Road Race Championships, Vladimir Miholjević
  Croatia Time Trial Championships, Vladimir Miholjević

References

External links
  

Cycling teams based in Italy
Cycling teams established in 2004
Cycling teams disestablished in 2012
Defunct cycling teams based in Italy